Clepsimelea is a genus of moths in the family Geometridae.

Species
 Clepsimelea phryganeoides Warren, 1897

References
 Clepsimelea at Markku Savela's Lepidoptera and Some Other Life Forms
 Natural History Museum Lepidoptera genus database

Ennominae
Geometridae genera